An annular solar eclipse occurred on November 23, 1965. A solar eclipse occurs when the Moon passes between Earth and the Sun, thereby totally or partly obscuring the image of the Sun for a viewer on Earth. An annular solar eclipse occurs when the Moon's apparent diameter is smaller than the Sun's, blocking most of the Sun's light and causing the Sun to look like an annulus (ring). An annular eclipse appears as a partial eclipse over a region of the Earth thousands of kilometres wide. Annularity was visible from the Soviet Union (today's eastern Turkmenistan, southern Uzbekistan and southwestern Tajikistan), Afghanistan, Pakistan, India, China, Nepal (including the capital city Kathmandu), southwestern Sikkim (now merged with India), Burma, southwestern tip of Sainyabuli Province in Laos, Cambodia, South Vietnam (now belonging to Vietnam), Spratly Islands, Brunei, Malaysia, Indonesia, the Territory of Papua New Guinea (today's Papua New Guinea), and Gilbert and Ellice Islands (the part now belonging to Kiribati). 8 of the 14 eight-thousanders—Dhaulagiri, Annapurna, Manaslu, Shishapangma, Cho Oyu, Everest, Lhotse and Makalu, as well as the highest peak of Oceania, Puncak Jaya, lie in the path of annularity.

Related eclipses

Solar eclipses of 1964–1967

Saros 132

Inex series

Metonic series

Notes

References

1965 11 23
1965 in science
1965 11 23
November 1965 events